Snickers salad is a dessert salad consisting of a mix of Snickers bars, Granny Smith apples, whipped cream and often pudding or whipped topping served in a bowl. It is a potluck and party staple in the Upper Midwest of the United States, where the "salad" is popular alongside glorified rice, Watergate salad, jello salad and hotdish. It is sometimes included in church cookbooks.

Snickers salad is easy to make; the ingredients are simply chopped and combined. As to whether it is a salad or a dessert, popular lore has it that it depends on which end of the table it is sitting at. 

The recipe for Snickers salad was included in a 2009 article "Salads worthy of a church picnic" in The Indianapolis Star. The author noted that "Despite what all my community and church cookbooks would say, I don't think anything with marshmallows can really be called a salad."

See also
Chocolate salo
List of salads

Notes

References
Joanne Raetz Stuttgen and Terese Allen Cafe Wisconsin Cookbook Univ of Wisconsin Press, 2007 p. 72, 73 (Google preview)

Cuisine of the Midwestern United States
Cuisine of Minnesota
American desserts
Salads